Peru requires its residents to register their motor vehicles and display vehicle registration plates. Current plates are North American standard 6 × 12 inches (152 × 300 mm).

All vehicles are required to display plates on the front and back. Peculiarly, taxis in Peru are also required to display the characters of the license plates on each side of the vehicle. This is done with a large decal.

In Peru, the old vehicle plates were made up of 2 letters and 4 numbers, separated by a hyphen, and had a white background with black letters and numbers.

Since 1995 they have been made up of 2 letters and 4 numbers or 3 letters and 3 numbers, separated by a hyphen, and have a white background with black letters and numbers. All the running plates have the letters PE at the top.

1924 - 1973: Early plates
License plates issued up to 1973 came in a variety of colors and styles. Many years had city names placed on them which created a variety of different plates issued each year.

1974 - 1995 Series
The first letter of these plates indicated the vehicle type, and the chart below shows the letters assigned to each type. The second letter indicated the region (or province for the City of Lima) where the vehicle was registered. The second chart below shows these codes.

1995 - 2009 Series
Plates issued during the years 1995 - 2009 continued to use the same format that was begun in 1975. The first letter continued to indicate the vehicle type, and the second letter indicated the region or province. These plates were black characters on a yellow background and they continued to use the same format, ABC-123, until all combinations in a region or province were exhausted. When complete, the old series was followed by plates with black characters on a white background, but they used the format AB-1234.

2010 Series

The redesign of the Peruvian plates included many changes. The national flag of Peru is displayed in color, without the shield, in the upper left hand corner. The word Peru is centered at the top in all capital letters. There is a holographic label at the top right with the plate number and nanotext, and any attempt to remove it will cause its destruction. The background to the plate has reflective sheeting which contains a high security seal (watermark). At the lower left of the plate a security serial number is laser engraved into the plate. In the background of the center of the plate is a three-dimensional interwoven sine wave. The plates are made of aluminum and are 150 mm tall by 300 mm wide except for motorcycles which are 110 mm tall by 190 mm wide. The holographic seal is also smaller on the motorcycle plates.

Region and province codes
The new series of plates began to be issued in January 2010. The first character of the plate continued to designate the region or province, but the letters were reassigned to different regions. With the new plate colors representing the vehicle type, the second character no longer represented the vehicle type.

Regular Series plates
The second character of these plates first takes on a numerical value of 1 to 9 (in order) followed by the number 0, and then the letters of the alphabet in alphabetical order.   All vehicles now are issued the so-called "third plate" which is a windshield sticker that includes an RFID chip. The RFID chip allows the police to electronically verify the registration of the vehicle with a hand-held reader. The third plate cannot be removed from the windshield without it being destroyed.

Special Series plates
All Special Series plates are easily distinguished by the small letter "E," representing the Spanish word especial, as the first character at the left hand side of the plate. To prevent confusion, the letter "E" is not used to identify any region or province.

Papal visit

For the visit of the Roman Catholic Pope, Francis, from 18-21 January 2018, special license plates were created. These plates have all of the same security features as regular plates, but the coloring, yellow and white which are the official colors of the Holy See, the lettering, and the use of the coat of arms of the Vatican, are unique to these plates. Three license plates of the style shown here were produced. Additionally, there were 30 Exhibition plates issued for the Papal delegation.

References

Peru
Transport in Peru
Peru transport-related lists